İçme is a village in the Elazığ District of Elazığ Province in Turkey. Its population is 526 (2021). Before the 2013 reorganisation, it was a town (belde). The village is populated by Turks.

References

Villages in Elazığ District